Migaku Takahashi from Tohoku University, Sendai, Japan was named Fellow of the Institute of Electrical and Electronics Engineers (IEEE) in 2014 for contributions to thin film technology for high-density recording media and heads.

References

Fellow Members of the IEEE
Living people
Year of birth missing (living people)
Place of birth missing (living people)
Academic staff of Tohoku University